Must (from the Latin vinum mustum, "young wine") is freshly crushed fruit juice (usually grape juice) that contains the skins, seeds, and stems of the fruit. The solid portion of the must is called pomace and typically makes up 7–23% of the total weight of the must. Making must is the first step in winemaking. Because of its high glucose content, typically between 10 and 15%, must is also used as a sweetener in a variety of cuisines. Unlike commercially sold grape juice, which is filtered and pasteurized, must is thick with particulate matter, opaque, and comes in various shades of brown and purple.

Winemaking
The length of time the pomace stays in the juice is critical for the final character of the wine. When the winemaker judges the time to be right, the juice is drained off the pomace, which is then pressed to extract the juice retained by the matrix. Yeast is added to the juice to begin the fermentation, while the pomace is often returned to the vineyard or orchard for use as fertilizer. A portion of selected unfermented must may be kept as Süssreserve, to be added as a sweetening component before bottling. Some winemakers create a second batch of wine from the used pomace by adding a quantity of water equivalent to the juice removed, letting the mixture sit for 24 hours, and draining off the liquid. This wine may be used as a drink for the employees of the winemaker or as a basis for some pomace brandies. Grappa, however, must by law be produced only from the pomace solids, with no water added.

Balsamico 

The must is also an essential ingredient for the production of Traditional Balsamic Vinegar, the special aged vinegar from the Emilia-Romagna region of Italy, protected under the European Protected Designated Origin system. Selected bacterial colonies or the lenta in superficie (slow surface) or lenta a truciolo (slow wood shavings) methods are used for acetification, and then there is a maturation phase. Both the acetification and the maturation take place in precious sessile oak (Quercus petraea), chestnut, oak, mulberry, and juniper barrels. After a minimum maturation period of 60 days, a group of expert technicians will test the resulting product analytically as well as organoleptically (via taste, aroma, the palette and other senses).

Mead 
This term is also used by meadmakers for the unfermented honey-water mixture that becomes mead. The analogous term in beer brewing is wort.

In cookery
 
In ancient Greece, must condensed by boiling was called siraion (σίραιον) and was used as a sweetener in the kitchen in various recipes (and as a syrup over teganitai (pancakes)). From the Greeks, the Romans in ancient Rome also used the condensed must in cooking, as a sweetener. Must was boiled in lead or bronze kettles into a milder concentrate called defrutum or a stronger concentrate called sapa. It was often used as a souring agent and preservative, especially in fruit dishes. 

Currently, reduced must is used in Greek, other Balkan countries, French and Middle Eastern cookery as a syrup known as petimezi, pekmez or dibis. In Greece, petimezi is a basic ingredient for a must-custard known as moustalevria, and a sweet-meal known as soutzoukos, churchkhela. The Moustokoúloura or "must cookies" are also popular Greek cookies, which are based on a sweet dough made by kneading flour, olive oil, spice, and must. They are made in various shapes and sizes, and they are dark brown in color because of the must and the spice in them. In the wine making areas of South Africa must is used to make a sweet bun known as Mosbolletjies.

The term petimezi is a Hellenized word of the Armenian/Trebizond term petmez. Petmez was a type of syrup that was made with berries of the White Mulberry tree; petmez was used in Byzantium (Trebizond was part of the Byzantine Empire), where White Mulberries grew in abundance, for their berries and for the silk worms that feed exclusively on Mulberry leaves.

Roman lead poisoning hypothesis
Geochemist Jerome Nriagu published an article in the New England Journal of Medicine in 1983 hypothesizing that defrutum and sapa may have contained enough lead acetate to be toxic to those who consumed them regularly.

In Christian liturgy

In Roman Catholic Eucharistic liturgy, must may be substituted for sacramental wine, on condition that the ordinary has granted permission for the benefit of a priest or lay person who should not, usually because of alcoholism, ingest wine; but in normal circumstances it may not be used in place of wine.

Official Roman Catholic documents define must (mustum in Latin) precisely as "grape juice that is either fresh or preserved by methods that suspend its fermentation without altering its nature (for example, freezing)", and it excludes pasteurized grape juice.

This teaching goes back at least to Pope Julius I (337–352), who is quoted in Thomas Aquinas's Summa Theologica as having declared that in case of necessity, but only then, juice pressed from a grape could be used. Aquinas himself declared that it is forbidden to offer fresh must in the chalice, because this is unbecoming owing to the impurity of the must; but he added that in case of necessity it may be done.

Aquinas himself declared:

Must has already the species of wine, for its sweetness ["Aut dulcis musti Vulcano decoquit humorem"; Virgil, Georg. i, 295] indicates fermentation, which is "the result of its natural heat" (Meteor. iv); consequently this sacrament can be made from must. ... It is forbidden to offer must in the chalice, as soon as it has been squeezed from the grape, since this is unbecoming owing to the impurity of the must. But in case of necessity it may be done: for it is said by the same Pope Julius, in the passage quoted in the argument: "If necessary, let the grape be pressed into the chalice."

Liturgical norms
The latest document from the Congregation for the Doctrine of the Faith on the matter, issued on 24 July 2003, gave the following norms, which simplify those previously in force:

The Ordinary is competent to give permission for an individual priest or layperson to use mustum for the celebration of the Eucharist. Permission can be granted habitually, for as long as the situation that occasioned the granting of permission continues (e.g., the priest is an alcoholic).

When the principal celebrant at a concelebration has permission to use mustum, a chalice of normal wine is to be prepared for the concelebrants.

Given the centrality of the celebration of the Eucharist in the life of a priest, one must proceed with great caution before admitting to Holy Orders those candidates unable to ingest alcohol without serious harm.

Attention should be paid to medical advances in the area of alcoholism and encouragement given to the production of unaltered mustum.

See also
 Amazake – similar early product in rice wine making
Apple cider
 Arrope
 Julmust
Wort – similar product in brewing beer
 List of juices

References

Further reading
 Baldy, Marian W. The University Wine Course: A Wine Appreciation Text & Self Tutorial, 2nd Edition. San Francisco: The Wine Appreciation Guild, 1995. .
 Gozzini Giacosa, Ilaria. A Taste of Ancient Rome. Chicago: University of Chicago Press, 1994. .
 Herbst, Ron, and Sharon Tyler Herbst. Wine Lover's Companion. Hauppauge, N.Y.: Barron's, 1995. .
 Nriagu, Jerome O. "Saturnine Gout Among Roman Aristocrats: Did Lead Poisoning Contribute to the Fall of the Empire?" New England Journal of Medicine 11, no. 308 (17 March 1983): 660–3. .
 Whittaker, John. Winemaking Made Easy. Edmonton: Lone Pine Publishing, 1993. .

External links
 Further information from the USCCB's Committee on Divine Worship
Further information from the Liturgy Office of the Catholic Bishops' Conference of England and Wales

Catholic liturgy
Eucharistic objects
Fruit juice
Winemaking